Koro-Toro Airport is an airport serving Koro-Toro, located in the Borkou region in Chad.

Facilities 

References 

Airports in Chad
Borkou Region